MBA is Master of Business Administration, a master's degree.

MBA or Mba may refer to:

Organizations
 Maldives Basketball Association
 Manitoba Bar Association
 Marine Biological Association of the United Kingdom
 Maschienenbau und Bahnbedarf AG, name used by Orenstein & Koppel in Nazi Germany
 Metropolitan Basketball Association, now-defunct basketball league in the Philippines
 Media Bloggers Association, US
 Ministry of Border Affairs (Myanmar)
 Montgomery Bell Academy, Nashville, Tennessee, USA
 Morbidelli-Benelli Armi, Italian motorcycle factory
 Mortgage Bankers Association, USA
 Mountain Bothies Association, Scottish huts charity
 MBAssociates, manufacturer of Gyrojet rocket guns

People
 Léon M'ba, first president of Gabon
 Paul Biyoghé Mba
 Nina Mba
 Stéphane N'Zue Mba

Places
 Moi International Airport, Mombasa, Kenya, IATA code

Other uses 
 International Biennale of Architecture in Kraków
 Mba languages
 Methylenebisacrylamide
 Middle Bronze Age
 ICHD classification and diagnosis of migraine#Migraine with brainstem aura